"Nanhai Chao", or "Southern Sea Tides", is a Cantonese song often sung by Overseas Chinese of Cantonese origin. Its melody is based on the folk songs of the fishermen in the Pearl River Delta and its adjacent coasts.

Cantonese Jyutping

Zing1 zing1 jat6 soeng5 zeoi6 waa4 zoeng1,
Hung4 min4 zi2 ging1 jau6 tim1 cin1 baak3 do3,
Jan1 jan1 maan6 sai3 zoeng6.

Ngo5 gin3 gong1 ciu4 ji1 jin4 teoi1 hei2 naa5 saan1 baan2,
Koek3 si6 cyun1 gwo3 juk6 jyu5 king4 lau4 san1 leng3 ging2,
Ngo5 giu3 hoi2 ciu4 bo1 tou4 bat1 jiu3 ze5 hung1 jung2,
Gaak3 zyu6 jat1 pin3 maan6 lei5 daai6 joeng4 gwai1 sam1 cit3.

Traditional Chinese
紅霞滿灑粵天東破曉，
蒸蒸日上序華章，
紅棉紫荊又添千百朶，
欣欣萬世象。

我見江潮依然推起那舢板，
卻是穿過玉宇瓊樓新靚景，
我叫海潮波濤不要這洶湧，
隔住一片萬里大洋歸心切。

English Translation
Red clouds are overtaking the Cantonese sky at daybreak,
The rising sun preludes an elegant prose;
The silk-cotton trees (symbolizing Guangzhou) and Hong Kong orchid trees (symbolizing Hong Kong) adds hundreds and thousands of blooms again,
What a prosperous picture to last forever!

I see river tides still pushing that "sampan" (an Asian boat),
But it rafts through a refreshing scene of edifices of jade.
I tell the ocean not to be so turbulent,
Across from thousands of miles of ocean I am homesick.

Cantonese-language songs
Guangdong folk songs